Richard Alan Gould (born 1970) is an English sports administrator who is the current chief executive of the England and Wales Cricket Board.

A son of retired football manager Bobby Gould, he was educated at Bristol Grammar School (1981–1988) and the Royal Military Academy, Sandhurst (SMC, Strategic and Military Leadership 1989–1990), Cranfield University, Milton Keynes (JDSC, Military and Strategic Leadership 1996) and Harvard Business School (AMP, Business/Commerce, General 2006). After serving six years with the 1st Royal Tank Regiment (1990–2001) as a tank commander, he entered sports administration.

He served Bristol City Football Club as Commercial Director (2001–2005) before joining Somerset County Cricket Club as chief executive (2005-2011). He replaced the long-serving Paul Sheldon at the Oval in 2011 as chief executive of Surrey County Cricket Club.

He announced his departure from Surrey Cricket on 14 May 2021 upon his appointment as chief executive of Bristol City. In October 2022 Gould was named as chief executive of the England and Wales Cricket Board with effect from January 2023. He actually took over in February 2023.

He and his wife, Rebecca have two daughters, Libby and Jess.

References

External links
 LinkedIn 
 Richard Gould to leave Surrey Cricket 
 The KIA Oval

1970 births
Living people
Royal Tank Regiment officers
English cricket administrators
Tank commanders
Harvard Business School alumni
People educated at Bristol Grammar School
Graduates of the Royal Military Academy Sandhurst
Alumni of Cranfield University
Bristol City F.C. non-playing staff